Cornips gravidspinatus is a species of moth of the family Tortricidae. It is found in the Democratic Republic of Congo.

The wingspan is about 18.2 mm. The ground colour of the forewings is yellow-brown with brown strigulation (fine streaks) and brown markings. The hindwings are brownish cream.

Etymology
The species name refers to the size of the thorns of the transtilla and is derived from Latin gravidus (meaning heavy, strong) and spinatus (meaning spinulose).

References

Moths described in 2010
Archipini
Endemic fauna of the Democratic Republic of the Congo